Kirkor Canbazyan (9 March 1912 – 7 July 2002) was a Turkish cyclist. He competed in the individual and team road race events at the 1936 Summer Olympics.

References

External links
 

1912 births
2002 deaths
Turkish male cyclists
Olympic cyclists of Turkey
Cyclists at the 1936 Summer Olympics
Place of birth missing